The 2003 Alabama Crimson Tide football team (variously "Alabama", "UA", "Bama", or "The Tide") represented the University of Alabama in the 2003 NCAA Division I-A football season. It was the Crimson Tide's 69th as a member of the Southeastern Conference (SEC) and its 12th within the SEC Western Division. The team was led by head coach Mike Shula, in his first year, and played their home games at Legion Field in Birmingham and Bryant–Denny Stadium in Tuscaloosa, Alabama. They finished the season with a record of four wins and nine losses (4–9, 2–6 in the SEC).

At the conclusion of the 2002 season, Dennis Franchione resigned as head coach and took the same position with Texas A&M. After a two-week-long coaching search, Washington State head coach Mike Price was hired as Franchione's replacement. Price then signed the 2003 recruiting class and led the Crimson Tide through spring practice. However, he was fired in May 2003 due to detrimental conduct as an employee of the University. Less than a week later, Mike Shula was hired as head coach of the Crimson Tide.

Alabama opened the season with what turned out to be their final game ever played at Legion Field with a victory over South Florida. After a loss to No. 1 Oklahoma in the second week, the Crimson Tide entered the rankings at No. 21 after their victory over Kentucky. However, they dropped out the next week after being upset by Northern Illinois. They then lost to Arkansas and Georgia before they defeated Southern Miss on homecoming. Alabama then lost consecutive games to Ole Miss and then in five overtimes to Tennessee before they won at Mississippi State. The Crimson Tide then closed the season with losses to LSU, Auburn and Hawaii and finished with an overall record of 4–9.

Before the season

NCAA sanctions
The 2003 season was impacted by sanctions imposed by the National Collegiate Athletic Association (NCAA) for violations that dated back as far as the late 1990s. On February 1, 2002, the NCAA imposed a two-year bowl ban, a reduction in athletic scholarships of 21 over a three-year period and five years of probation. The NCAA sanctioned the University after they found 11 major violations and five minor ones as part of their investigation that included boosters who provided players and coaches with improper benefits in violation of NCAA rules. On September 17, 2002, the NCAA rejected Alabama's appeal to reduce the severity of the sanctions. At that time, the NCAA stated they felt that the sanctions were appropriate and that it was only because of the cooperation of the University that the death penalty for the football program was not considered. As the appeal was denied, for the 2003 season Alabama saw a smaller recruiting class and was ineligible for both the 2003 SEC Championship Game and bowl games. The latter penalty would end up being meaningless due to the Tide going 4-9.

Franchione resignation
Late in the 2002 season, rumors were abound that head coach Dennis Franchione was going to resign from Alabama to take the head coaching position with Texas A&M. On December 2, 2002, A&M head coach R. C. Slocum was fired after he served 14 seasons in the position. Three days later, Franchione left Tuscaloosa and formally accepted the Aggies coaching vacancy on December 6.

Mike Price era
Immediately after the resignation of Franchione, athletic director Mal Moore started the search for his replacement. In the week of December 9, South Florida head coach Jim Leavitt was interviewed and then New Orleans Saints assistant coach Mike Riley was actually offered the Alabama coaching position, which he later declined. After Riley turned down the position, Moore considered several other candidates. Included in the search were head coaches Les Miles of Oklahoma State, Rich Rodriguez of West Virginia  and Mike Price of Washington State. On December 17, Price was officially named as the new head coach for the Crimson Tide. Price did not fully assume his duties as head coach until January 4, after he coached Washington State in the 2003 Rose Bowl.

Coaching staff
In addition to completing the 2003 recruiting class, Price worked to assemble his staff in the weeks after he arrived in Tuscaloosa. Four of his assistants from Washington State came with Price to coach at Alabama: Chris Ball, Bob Connelly, Kasey Dunn and Aaron Price. The remainder of the staff was filled in the weeks that followed National Signing Day.

Recruiting class

As part of the NCAA imposed penalties related to the Albert Means recruiting scandal that dated back to 1999, Alabama had the total number of football scholarships it could award reduced by seven to 18 instead of the standard 25. As such, the 2003 class only had eighteen members, with most being from within the state of Alabama. With the departure of Franchione, the Alabama recruiting coordinator Randy Ross helped keep the class together during the transition period prior to the arrival of Price.

Spring practice
The 2003 spring practices started on March 3, and concluded with the annual A-Day game on March 29. During the month of practice, offensively the team began the transition from Franchione's option offense to Price's passing attack. For the A-Day game, the Crimson team of offensive starters defeated the White team of defensive starters by a final score of 47–0 before 34,000 fans in Bryant–Denny Stadium. For their performances, Antwan Odom earned the Dwight Stephenson Lineman of the A-Day Game Award and Brodie Croyle earned the Dixie Howell Memorial Most Valuable Player of the A-Day Game Award.

Dismissal
On May 3, 2003, university president Robert Witt announced the firing of Price immediately as the head coach of the Crimson Tide. Although both the University and Price were in agreement in principle to his seven-year, $10 million contract, Price never signed it and thus was not awarded any severance pay with his dismissal. Later, a story in Sports Illustrated stated Price had been seen at a strip club "making it rain" and yelling "Roll Tide, Roll!". He allegedly later checked into a local hotel with at least one exotic dancer from the club, and the magazine further alleged Price had sex with one of the strippers, a claim which Price denied, although he acknowledged being intoxicated on the evening in question. He filed a $20 million libel and defamation suit against Sports Illustrated.

Mike Shula hiring
After the dismissal of Price, Alabama interviewed only three candidates to serve as his successor: Sylvester Croom, Richard Williamson and Mike Shula. On May 9, 2003, Alabama hired Mike Shula as their fourth head coach in four years.

Personnel

Staff changes
Alabama head coach Mike Shula entered his first year as the Crimson Tide's head coach for the 2003 season, and it was also his first all-time season as a head coach. After he was hired, Shula retained much of the coaching staff put in place by former head coach Mike Price; however, he did make several changes. On May 13, David Rader was hired to serve as both offensive coordinator and quarterbacks coach as the replacement for both Aaron Price and Eric Price. On May 23, Dave Ungerer was hired to serve as special teams coach as the replacement for Aaron Price. The final coach added was Charlie Harbison as running backs coach as the replacement for Kasey Dunn.

Roster

Schedule
The 2003 schedule was anomalous for a variety of reasons.  With a two-year bowl ban imposed by the NCAA in 2002 through 2004, Alabama added a thirteenth game against Hawaii in Honolulu to the 2002 and 2003 schedules that the university would hope to serve as an effective replacement for a bowl game.  The 2003 season marked just the fifth time since 1947 that the Iron Bowl was not Alabama's final regular season game (2002 at Hawaii; 2001 Southern Miss; 1988 at Texas A&M; 1963 at Miami).  Also beginning in 2003, the SEC altered its scheduling methodology—permanent cross-division opponents were reduced from two to one (i.e. instead of Alabama playing Tennessee and Vanderbilt annually, the Tide would only face Tennessee every year while the Commodores would rotate onto Alabama's schedule along with the rest of the SEC Eastern teams).  This change resulted in Alabama not playing Vanderbilt for the first time since 1952.  Finally, the Crimson Tide played their final home game at Legion Field, which had hosted many Alabama games over the previous century (including the entire 1987 home schedule).

Source: Rolltide.com All-time Football Results: 2003 Season

Game summaries

South Florida

Source:

In 2000, the NCAA voted to allow its member schools to schedule a 12th game for both the 2002 and 2003 seasons. As such, in June 2000 Alabama scheduled the South Florida Bulls to open the 2003 season in the first all-time meeting between the schools. In what was the first game of the Mike Shula era, Shaud Williams scored three touchdowns in this 40–17 victory at Legion Field. After each team traded punts to open the game, the Bulls took an early 7–0 lead when Ronnie Banks threw a 13-yard touchdown pass to Brian Fisher. The Crimson Tide tied the game at 7–7 later in the first quarter after Charlie Peprah intercepted a Banks pass and returned it 51-yards for the touchdown. South Florida responded in the second quarter and took a 17–7 lead on a 17-yard Brian Fisher touchdown run and 45-yard Santiago Gramática field goal. Alabama then tied the game 17–17 at halftime after they scored ten points in the final 0:26 of the half. After Brodie Croyle threw a 10-yard touchdown pass to Triandos Luke, the Bulls' J. R. Reed fumbled the kickoff that ensued and gave the Crimson Tide possession at the USF 24-yard line. Three plays later the score was tied after Brian Bostick connected on a 40-yard field goal as time expired.

Alabama took their first lead of the game after they scored on a 25-yard Brian Bostick field goal early in the third quarter. After the Crimson Tide defense held the Bulls to a three-and-out on their first second half possession, Shaud Williams returned a punt 73-yards for a touchdown and a 27–17 lead. Williams then scored his second touchdown on Alabama's next offensive possession with his three-yard run, and after a blocked extra point led 33–17. After Gramática missed a 19-yard field goal early in the fourth quarter, the Crimson Tide went on a 15-play, 80-yard drive that culminated in Williams' third touchdown of the game on a one-yard run and made the final score 40–17. For his 98-yards rushing and two touchdowns, Williams was named the SEC Offensive Player of the Week.

This game is also notable for being the final home game played by the Crimson Tide at Legion Field. Although Alabama was scheduled to play Middle Tennessee at Legion to open the 2005 season and was under contract to play one final game in either the 2007 or 2008 seasons, in August 2004 the eastern upper deck at the stadium was declared structurally unsound and unsafe to use. As such, on August 19, 2004, Alabama and Birmingham officials canceled their contract to play the final two games at Legion Field and thus made the game against the Bulls the final for the Crimson Tide in Birmingham.

Oklahoma

Source:

In what was the first game ever played by Oklahoma in the state of Alabama, the Crimson Tide nearly upset the No. 1 ranked Sooners only to lose 20–13 at Bryant–Denny Stadium. Oklahoma took a 6–0 first quarter lead after Trey DiCarlo connected on field goals of 34 and 40 yards. Midway through the second quarter, the Crimson Tide cut the Sooners' lead in half to 6–3 on a 44-yard Brian Bostick field goal. However, Oklahoma responded on their next possession when Jason White threw a 46-yard touchdown pass to Mark Clayton and gave the Sooners a 13–3 halftime lead.

After DiCarlo missed a 31-yard field goal late in the third quarter, the Crimson Tide scored their only touchdown of the game on the drive that ensued on a 20-yard Brodie Croyle pass to Triandos Luke and made the score 13–10. Oklahoma responded almost immediately on the next drive with a 47-yard White touchdown pass to Brandon Jones and extended their lead back to ten points at 20–10. The final points of the game came late in the fourth quarter on a 36-yard Bostick field goal that made the final score 20–13. The loss brought Alabama's all-time record against the Sooners to 1–2–1.

Kentucky

Source:

To open conference play for the 2003 season, Alabama hosted the Kentucky Wildcats and behind Shaud Williams' second three touchdown game of the season won 27–17. After Brian Bostick missed a 27-yard field goal on the opening possession of the game, several punts were traded before Williams scored his first touchdown on a 15-yard run to give Alabama a 7–0 first quarter lead. After a 43-yard Bostick field goal extended the Alabama lead to 10–0 early in the second quarter, the Wildcats made the halftime score 10–7 after Draak Davis scored on a one-yard touchdown run. Alabama threatened to score a touchdown just before halftime, but the Brodie Croyle pass was intercepted in the endzone by Chad Anderson for a touchback.

In the third quarter Bostick scored on a 30-yard field goal and Taylor Begley scored on a 27-yard field goal for the Wildcats that made the score 13–10 as the teams entered the fourth quarter. On the first play of the fourth, Williams scored his second touchdown of the game on a two-yard run for a 20–10 Crimson Tide lead. Begley missed a 49-yard field goal later in the quarter, and on the Alabama drive that ensued, Williams scored his third touchdown of the game on a seven-yard run and made the score 27–10. Kentucky then made the final score 27–17 when Jared Lorenzen threw a 24-yard touchdown pass to Derek Abney late in the fourth quarter. For his 174-yards rushing and three touchdowns, Williams was named the SEC Offensive Player of the Week for the second time of the season. The victory improved Alabama's all-time record against the Wildcats to 32–2–1.

Northern Illinois

Source:

Although the No. 21 Crimson Tide were two touchdown favorites over Northern Illinois, they were upset 19–16 in what was the first all-time win over a SEC team for the Huskies. Late in the first quarter, Alabama scored a touchdown on a 28-yard Brodie Croyle pass to Zach Fletcher. However, the extra point was blocked by Jason Frank and returned by Kevin Woods for a defensive two-point conversion and a 6–2 Crimson Tide lead. In the second quarter, the Huskies scored on a 51-yard Steve Azar field goal before Brian Bostick kicked a field goal from 35 yards out and made the halftime score 9–5.

Northern then took a 12–9 lead midway through the third quarter when Josh Haldi threw a 12-yard touchdown pass to Shatone Powers. After a series of punts, midway through the fourth quarter, Haldi  threw a 48-yard touchdown pass to Dan Sheldon and extended the Huskies' lead to 19–9. Alabama responded on their next possession with a 54-yard Shaud Williams touchdown run that made the score 19–16. However this proved to be the final points of the game in their defeat.

Arkansas

Source:

Although the Crimson Tide led Arkansas by three touchdowns late in the third quarter, the Razorbacks rallied to tie the game at the end of regulation and win on a field goal in the second overtime period by a final score of 34–31. Arkansas took an early 7–0 lead after Matt Jones scored a touchdown on a 39-yard run on the opening drive of the game. After David Carlton missed a 32-yard field goal on their second possession, Alabama tied the game on the drive that ensued when Brodie Croyle threw a 16-yard touchdown pass to Triandos Luke. After Carlton missed his second field goal of the game early in the second quarter, Chris Balseiro gave the Razorbacks a 10–7 lead on their next possession with his 38-yard field goal. The Crimson Tide responded on their next possession with a 48-yard Brian Bostick field goal as time expired to tie the game 10–10 at halftime.

Alabama opened the third quarter with a 71-yard Croyle touchdown pass to Dre Fulgham for a 17–10 lead. On their first offensive play of the second half, Jones threw an interception to Anthony Madison that was returned to the Arkansas 23-yard line. Three plays later the Crimson Tide led 24–10 when Croyle connected with Fulgham on a 12-yard touchdown pass. Alabama then scored their third consecutive touchdown on their next possession on an 80-yard Shaud Williams touchdown run for a 31–10 lead. Arkansas then responded with three straight touchdowns of their own to tie the game at the end of regulation. The first came late in the third quarter on a five-yard Cedric Cobbs touchdown run and the final pair came in the fourth quarter on a two-yard Mark Pierce run and a three-yard Richard Smith reception from Jones.

In the first overtime period, Charles Jones intercepted a Jones pass to keep Arkansas scoreless. However, Alabama also failed to convert a 36-yard Bostick field goal to send the game into a second overtime. On the first play of the second overtime, Croyle was intercepted by Jimarr Gallon to again keep Alabama scoreless. Seven plays into their possession, Arkansas connected on a 19-yard Balseiro field goal and won the game 34–31. The loss brought Alabama's all-time record against the Razorbacks 8–6 (9–5 without an NCAA forfeit).

Georgia

Source:

In what was their first road game of the season, Alabama traveled  to Athens where the Georgia Bulldogs scored 31 points in the second quarter en route to a 37–23 victory. After the Crimson Tide took an early 3–0 lead on a 42-yard Brian Bostick field goal, Georgia responded with a trio of Billy Bennett field goals from 27, 44 and 52-yards to take a 9–3 lead early in the second quarter. Georgia then extended their lead to 37–10 by halftime with four second-quarter touchdowns.

The Bulldogs scored first when Jarrett Berry blocked a Bo Freelend punt that was returned seven-yards by Thomas Davis for a touchdown. The Georgia defense then held the Crimson Tide and forced a change of possession on downs to give the Bulldogs the ball at the Alabama 44-yard line. Five plays later, D. J. Shockley threw a 10-yard touchdown pass to Jamario Smith for a 23–3 lead. After Ramzee Robinson fumbled the kickoff that ensued, Georgia took possession and four plays later led 30–3 when Kregg Lumpkin scored on a one-yard run. On their next possession, Alabama managed to score their first touchdown on an 18-yard Spencer Pennington pas to Dre Fulgham that made the score 30–10. The Crimson Tide defense did get a stop on their next possession to force a Georgia punt; however, on the first offensive play for Alabama, Pennington fumbled to give the Bulldogs possession at their 29-yard line. With only 0:30 left in the quarter, Georgia made the halftime score 37–10 when David Greene threw a three-yard touchdown pass to Benjamin Watson.

Although the Alabama defense held Georgia scoreless in the second half, so did the Georgia defense and the only second half points came on a pair of defensive touchdowns for the Crimson Tide. In the third quarter, Charles Jones intercepted a Greene pass and returned it 30-yards for a touchdown, and early in the fourth Juwan Garth recovered a fumble and returned it 10-yards to make the final score 37–23. The loss brought Alabama's all-time record against the Bulldogs 35–24–4.

Southern Miss

Source:

On homecoming in Tuscaloosa, Alabama defeated the Southern Miss Golden Eagles 17–3 in what was the first all-time start for quarterback Brandon Avalos. The Crimson Tide took a 7–0 first quarter lead when Shaud Williams scored on a 44-yard touchdown run. After a series of punts, late in the second quarter, Alabama connected on a 23-yard Brian Bostick field goal and Southern Miss on a 27-yard Darren McCaleb field goal that made the halftime score 10–3.

After a scoreless third quarter, Bostick missed a 36-yard field goal before Chris James blocked a Luke Johnson punt that gave the Crimson Tide possession at the Golden Eagles' one-yard line. On the next play, Williams made the score 17–3 with his one-yard touchdown run. The game concluded with a pair of lost fumbles by Southern Miss and an Avalos interception with a final score of 17–3. In the game, Williams rushed for 170 yards on 28 carries and was responsible for both of Alabama's touchdowns in the game. The victory improved Alabama's all-time record against the Golden Eagles to 32–6–2 (33–5–2 without an NCAA forfeit).

Ole Miss

Source:

In their annual rivalry game against Ole Miss, the Rebels took a 24–0 first quarter lead that they did not relinquish in their 43–28 victory at Oxford. The Rebels took a 3–0 lead early in the first after Jonathan Nichols connected on a 52-yard field goal. On Alabama's first offensive series, Brodie Croyle threw an interception to Travis Johnson that gave the Rebels possession at their 23-yard line. On the next play, Ole Miss took a 10–0 lead after Eli Manning threw a 23-yard touchdown pass to Taye Biddle. The Ole Miss defense then forced a punt, and Manning followed with a 55-yard touchdown pass to extend their lead to 17–0. The Rebels then closed the first quarter with a 10-yard Brandon Jacobs touchdown run that made the score 24–0.

The Crimson Tide cut into the Ole Miss lead and made the score 24–10 after they scored on their first two possessions of the second quarter. Shaud Williams scored first on a three-yard touchdown run followed by a 32-yard Brian Bostick field goal. The Rebels responded later in the quarter when Manning threw a 41-yard touchdown pass to Kerry Johnson 41-yard pass that made the halftime score 31–10.

The Ole Miss defense held the Crimson Tide to a three-and-out to open the second half, and the offense extended their lead to 38–10 after Manning scored on a three-yard touchdown run. Later in the quarter, Chris James blocked a Cody Ridgeway punt and returned it 32-yards for a touchdown that made the score 38–16. Early in the fourth, the Rebels scored their final points of the game on a 19-yard Nichols field goal. Later in the fourth, Alabama scored a pair of touchdowns that made the final score 43–28. The first came on a 22-yard Croyle pass to Ray Hudson and the second on a five-yard Croyle pass to Williams after a successful onside kick. The loss brought Alabama's all-time record against the Rebels to 40–9–2 (41–8–2 without an NCAA forfeit).

Tennessee

Source:

In what is the longest game ever played by the Crimson Tide to date, Alabama lost in five overtime periods to the Tennessee Volunteers 51–43 in their annual rivalry game. The first scoring opportunity of the afternoon came early in the first quarter when Mark Jones fumbled a Bo Freelend punt that was recovered by Roberto McBride to give Alabama possession at the Tennessee 26-yard line. Seven plays later the Crimson Tide took a 3–0 lead on a 33-yard Brian Bostick field goal. Neither team would score again until late in the second quarter when James Wilhoit connected on a 31-yard field goal for the Vols and Bostick connected on a 48-yard field goal that made the halftime score 6–3.

In the third quarter, Tennessee took a 10–6 lead after James Banks scored on a 25-yard run to open the half. After Corey Campbell intercepted a Brodie Croyle pass on the Alabama possession that ensued, the Vols extended their lead to 13–6 with a 38-yard Wilhoit field goal. The Crimson Tide tied the game 13–13 later in the quarter on a 36-yard Croyle touchdown pass to Triandos Luke. In the fourth, Alabama scored on a two-yard Ray Hudson touchdown run and Tennessee responded to tie the game 20–20 late on a one-yard Casey Clausen touchdown pass to Troy Fleming that sent the game into overtime.

In the first overtime period, the Vols scored on a six-yard Clausen touchdown pass to Derrick Tinsley. The Crimson Tide responded with a six-yard Croyle pass to Dre Fulgham that sent the game into a second overtime tied at 27–27. In the second overtime, Tim Castille scored on a 12-yard touchdown run for Alabama. Tennessee then scored on a five-yard Clausen touchdown pass to Banks that sent the game into a third overtime tied 34–34. In the third overtime, Clausen threw his second touchdown pass to Banks from 25-yards out for the Vols. The Crimson Tide responded with a 12-yard Williams touchdown run that sent the game into a fourth overtime tied 40–40. In the fourth overtime, each team traded field goals that made the score 43–43 as they entered the fifth overtime. In the fifth and final overtime period, Clausen scored on a one-yard touchdown run and Alabama failed to score that resulted in a 51–43 Tennessee victory. The loss brought Alabama's all-time record against the Volunteers to 44–35–7 (44–34–8 without an NCAA forfeit).

Mississippi State

Source:

Two weeks after their five overtime loss against Tennessee, the Crimson Tide rebounded with this 38–0 victory over the Mississippi State Bulldogs in their annual rivalry game at Starkville. Alabama opened the game with an 86-yard Brodie Croyle touchdown pass to Zach Fletcher for an early 7–0 Crimson Tide lead. On the Bulldogs' possession that ensued, Charlie Peprah intercepted a Kevin Fant pass at the State 33-yard line. Three plays later, the Crimson Tide led 14–0 after Croyle threw a 17-yard touchdown pass to Tyrone Prothro. In the second quarter, Alabama scored on a 38-yard Brian Bostick field goal and a 32-yard Croyle pass to Fletcher for a 24–0 halftime lead.

After a scoreless third quarter, a pair of fourth-quarter touchdowns made the final score 38–0. The first came on a three-yard Shaud Williams touchdown run and the second on a six-yard Tim Castille touchdown run. The victory improved Alabama's all-time record against the Bulldogs to 69–16–3 (70–15–3 without NCAA forfeit). This was also Alabama's first win in Starkville since 1994.

LSU

Source:

In what was the final home game of the season, against the eventual national champion LSU Tigers, Alabama lost 27–3. LSU took an early 3–0 lead when Chris Jackson connected on a 20-yard field goal on their first possession. After a defensive three-and-out, the Tigers extended their lead to 10–0 when Matt Mauck threw a 23-yard touchdown pass to Michael Clayton. The second quarter saw each quarterback throw an interception and LSU score on a three-yard Mauck touchdown pass to Eric Edwards for a 17–0 halftime lead.

After Brian Bostick missed a 45-yard field goal early in the third, the Tigers extended their lead to 24–0 on a four-yard Alley Broussard touchdown run. After a 33-yard Jackson field goal made the score 27–0, Alabama prevented the shutout with a 27-yard Brian Bostick field goal late in the fourth quarter that made the final score 27–3. The loss brought Alabama's all-time record against the Tigers to 44–19–5.

Auburn

Source:

In the 2003 edition of the Iron Bowl against the Auburn, the Tigers won for the second consecutive year with this 28–23 victory. Auburn took a 7–0 lead on the first offensive play of the game on an 80-yard Cadillac Williams touchdown run. After an Alabama punt was downed at the Auburn one-yard line, Williams was tackled in the end zone on the next play for a safety that made the score 7–2. The Tigers' defense then forced a three-and-out, and three plays later Jason Campbell threw a 64-yard touchdown pass to Ben Obomanu and after the two-point conversion led 15–2. A 22-yard John Vaughn field goal then made the score 18–2 at the end of the first quarter, and remained the same at halftime after a scoreless second quarter.

The Crimson Tide opened the second half with a touchdown on the first play of the third quarter on a 96-yard Brandon Brooks kickoff return that made the score 18–9. After the Alabama defense forced an Auburn punt, the Crimson Tide cut the Tigers' lead to 18–16 after Shaud Williams scored on a six-yard touchdown run. A 32-yard Vaughn field goal made the score 21–16 in favor of the Tigers as they entered the fourth quarter. In the final quarter, Auburn scored on a one-yard Williams run and Alabama on a 14-yard Brodie Croyle pass to Lance Taylor that made the final score 28–23. The Loss brought Alabama's all-time record against the Tigers to 39–29–1.

Hawaii

Source:

As a result of the two-year bowl ban imposed by the NCAA in 2002 and NCAA rules that allow schools to add a 13th game if it is played at Hawaii, the Crimson Tide closed the season at Aloha Stadium, and in the game, the Warriors defeated the Crimson Tide 37–29. The Crimson Tide took a 7–0 first quarter lead after Shaud Williams scored on a one-yard touchdown run. Early in the second quarter, Alabama extended their lead to 14–0 on a two-yard Brodie Croyle touchdown pass to Clint Johnston before the Warriors rallied and scored a pair of touchdowns to tie the game 14–14 at halftime. Hawaii touchdowns were scored on Jason Whieldon passes of 48-yards to Jeremiah Cockheran and four-yards to Se'e Poumele.

The Warriors then took their first lead in the third after Lance Samuseva sacked Brodie Croyle for a safety. On the Hawaii drive that ensued, Anthony Madison blocked a Nolan Miranda field goal attempt that was returned by Roman Harper for a touchdown to give Alabama a 21–16 lead. The Warriors then scored three fourth-quarter touchdowns and won the game 37–29. The first to be scored were on Whieldon touchdown passes of 47-yards to Cockheran and 20-yards to Clifton Herbert before he scored their final points on an 18-yard run. Alabama then made the final score 37–29 after Croyle threw a five-yard touchdown pass to Lance Taylor late in the game. The loss brought Alabama's all-time record against Hawaii to 1-1.

References
General

 

Specific

Alabama
Alabama Crimson Tide football seasons
Alabama Crimson Tide football